Łaziska Power Station is a thermal power station in Łaziska Górne, Poland.  The first Łaziska Power Station was inaugurated in 1917.  In 1929, an 87.1 MW unit was inaugurated making it to the largest power station in Poland at those days.

Operation
The current Łaziska Power Station was built in 1967–1972. It has six units. Three units have capacity of 225 MW, two 125 MW, and one 230 MW.

See also
 Katowice Power Station 
 Jaworzno Power Station 
 Kozienice Power Station 
 Połaniec Power Station 
 List of power stations in Poland

References

 Elektrownia Łaziska
 PKE SA Elektrownia Łaziska
 Tauron oddział Elektrownia Łaziska

Coal-fired power stations in Poland
Mikołów County
Buildings and structures in Silesian Voivodeship